Sebastiania haploclada is a species of flowering plant in the family Euphorbiaceae. It was described in 1900. It is native to Peru.

References

Plants described in 1900
Flora of Peru
haploclada